The Danish Center for Urban History is a research and communication center for the history of cities in Denmark. The center was founded in 2001 by The Institute of History and Area Studies at the University of Aarhus and The Old Town, National Open Air Museum of Urban History and Culture. The Center has two book series called "Danish Urban Studies" and "Writings on Danish Urban History" with books and articles about Danish urban history from medieval ages until today. The center communicates Danish urban history to a wider audience on the internet through a website called The Digital City Gate which gives access to databases and presentations of Danish urban history with emphasis on the period from 1600-1900.

See also
 Urban history

References
Daily executive Mikkel Thelle, PHD, assistant professor

External links
Official website

Historiography of Denmark
Local history